The Douglas A-33 (Model 8A-5) was an American attack aircraft built in small numbers during World War II. It was an updated version of the Northrop A-17, with a more powerful engine and an increased bomb load. While the A-33 was intended initially for the export market, the entire production run was taken up by the United States Army Air Corps.

Design and development
In 1932, the Northrop Corporation had been formed as a partly owned subsidiary of Douglas and by 1937, the Northrop Model 8 became known as the Douglas 8A produced in the El Segundo Division of Douglas aircraft.

The 8A-5 was powered by a 1,200 hp (895 kW) Wright R-1820-87 engine and was the most powerful and best armed of the series, with four wing mounted 0.30 in machine guns, two 0.50 in machine guns in pods below the wing, a rear-firing flexibly mounted 0.30 in gun, and the ability carry up to 2,000 lb of bombs.

Operational history
Early in 1940, the Norwegian government ordered 36 8A-5s which not had been delivered before Norway was invaded by the Germans. Completed between October 1940 and January 1941, the aircraft were delivered to a training center in Canada that had been set up for the Norwegian government-in-exile, named "Little Norway" at Toronto Island Airport, Ontario.

After the loss of two aircraft and a reassessment of the training needs now met by the use of other aircraft, the remaining 34 Model 8A-5Ps were sold to Peru. However, 31 were repossessed by the Army Air Corps at the start of World War II. These aircraft, designated A-33, were used for training, target tug, and utility duties.

Variants
Model 8A-5 
A-33 
Serial numbers: 42-13584/13601; 42-109007/109019

Operators

 Little Norway

 United States Army Air Corps

Specifications (A-33)

See also

References
Notes

Bibliography

 Francillon, René J. McDonnell Douglas Aircraft since 1920. London: Putnam, 1979. .
 Pelletier, Alain J. "Northrop's Connection: The unsung A-17 attack aircraft and its legacy, Part 1". Air Enthusiast No 75, May–June 1998, pp. 62–67. Stamford, Lincolnshire: Key Publishing. .
 Pelletier, Alain J. "Northrop's Connection: The unsung A-17 attack aircraft and its legacy, Part 2". Air Enthusiast No 77, September–October 1998, pp. 2–15. Stamford, Lincolnshire: Key Publishing. .
 Wagner, Ray. American Combat Planes of the 20th Century, Third Enlarged Edition. New York: Doubleday, 1982. .
Andrade, John M. . U.S Military Aircraft Designations and Serials since 1909. Leicester: Midland Counties Publications, 1979. .
Swanborough, F. G. and Peter M. Bowers. United States Military aircraft since 1909. London: Putnam, 1963, 1971, 1989. .

Further reading

External links

 National Museum of the USAF - A-33 Fact Sheet
 Douglas 8A-5 for Norway, A-33

1940s United States attack aircraft
World War II trainer aircraft of the United States
Single-engined tractor aircraft
Low-wing aircraft
A-33
Aircraft first flown in 1940